Martin Lawlor (1 November 1896 – 19 May 1979), also known as Martin Lalor, was an Irish hurler. Usually lining out as at corner-back, he was a member of the Kilkenny team that won the 1922 All-Ireland Championship.

Lawlor hailed from a family that had a strong association with hurling. His close relatives, Martin and Jim Lalor, were renowned hurley makers and both won back-to-back All-Ireland medals in 1904 and 1905.

Lawlor enjoyed a lengthy career with Tulla, however, he enjoyed little in terms of championship success.

After being selected for the Kilkenny senior team in 1921, Lawlor was a regular member of the team for the subsequent five championship seasons. He won his first Leinster medal in 1922 before later winning his sole All-Ireland medal after Kilkenny's defeat of Tipperary in the final. Lawlor won further Leinster medals in 1923 and 1925.

Lalwor died on 19 May 1979.

Honours

Kilkenny
All-Ireland Senior Hurling Championship (1): 1922
Leinster Senior Hurling Championship (3): 1922, 1923, 1925

References

1896 births
1979 deaths
Kilkenny inter-county hurlers
All-Ireland Senior Hurling Championship winners
Tulla (Kilkenny) hurlers